Carabanchel Prison was constructed by political prisoners after the Spanish Civil War between 1940 and 1944 in the Madrid neighbourhood of Carabanchel. It was one of the biggest prisons in Europe until its closure in 1998. The structure followed the panopticon model devised by Jeremy Bentham in 1785.

History

During caudillo Francisco Franco's Spanish State (1936–1975) the prison hosted a large community of political prisoners, which included members of socialist, anarchist, communist and marxist political parties and union leaders. Notable inmates included Marcelino Camacho (leader of the Communist clandestine union Comisiones Obreras) and the rest of top-rank members of it imprisoned as a result of the Process 1001, Julián Ariza (member also of the same union), Nicolás Redondo (leader of Workers' General Union), Eduardo Saborido, Simón Sánchez Montero (Communist leader, who served 25 years in prison), José María Ruiz Gallardón (monarchist opponent to the Francoist State and father of the former Minister of Justice Alberto Ruiz Gallardón), Nicolás Sartorius,<ref>[http://www.elmundo.es/magazine/num149/textos/cara1.html Los últimos de Carabanchel, Magazine de El Mundo]</ref> Ramón Tamames, Enrique Múgica and Enrique Curiel (Communist activists), Miguel Boyer (Socialist activist and a minister later), Fernando Sánchez-Dragó, Miguel Gila, Fernando Savater, Fernando Arrabal, CNT member Luís Andrés Edo and would-be Franco assassins Stuart Christie and Fernando Carballo Blanco. Colombian Cocaine Kingpins Jorge Luis Ochoa Vásquez and Gilberto Rodríguez Orejuela where also imprisoned in Carabanchel in the mid 1980's. After Franco's death, only common criminals and members of the Basque separatist group ETA and other paramilitary groups remained.

After its abandonment, the building was heavily looted and was inhabited by non-Spaniards. Most of the prison walls were covered with graffiti, some of them very elaborate. A lengthy debate took place between the neighbours from Carabanchel and Aluche, who wanted a hospital and other public facilities to be built in the area, and the local authorities, who want to privatize the land for housing development. The neighbours also wanted part of the prison to be preserved.

Finally in July 2008, local and national government reached an agreement on the future of the prison lot, projecting to build 650 apartments, a hospital, green zones and government buildings on the former prison grounds. Despite protests the entire Carabanchel complex was demolished in late 2008.

 Notes 
Urban-travel.org @ The Carabanchel Prison, inside shots.

 References 
Chance, C. (2005) Carabanchel: The Last Brit in Europe's Hellhole Prison. Mainstream.
Díaz Cardiel, V. (2007) "Algunos recuerdos de mis cuatro estancias en la cárcel de Carabanchel" El Rapto de Europa'' 11: 13-19.
Photos from the prison 
Photos from Carabanchel at flickr.com 
Urban-travel.org @ The Carabanchel Prison, photos from inside

External links

Defunct prisons in Spain
Buildings and structures in Carabanchel District, Madrid
History of Madrid